SS Heimara (sometimes spelled as  Himara or Chimara) was a passenger steamer operating the Piraeus – Thessaloniki route. The ship hit a reef and sank on 19 January 1947 in the Aegean Sea, killing around 400 people. It is Greece's deadliest maritime disaster.

Background

The vessel was built in 1905 as SS Hertha by Stettiner Oderwerke at Stettin, German Pomerania. Originally, she was used to carry mail and after 1914 as a hospital ship and a minelayer in the service of the Imperial Navy. In the summer of 1946, she was transferred to the Greek State as a German WW2 reparation and was renamed SS Heimara after Himara, a city in Albania.

Sinking
On January 18, 1947, Heimara sailed from Thessaloniki bound for Piraeus with a crew of 86 and about 550 passengers. With the Greek Civil War in progress, 36 of the passengers were political prisoners being sent to exile. Due to adverse weather conditions, her captain decided to set course through the Euboean Gulf and avoid the dangerous Cape Kafireas (Cavo D' Oro) at the southeastern tip of the island of Euboea. After a stopover in Chalkida where she disembarked 10 passengers, she put to sea again at 01.30 am. The collision caused rudder and radio damage as well as flooding.

It took Heimara one and a half hours to sink after the accident, only one mile off the shore of Kavalliani islet. However, the panic during her disorderly abandonment, combined with the low temperatures and strong sea currents, resulted in around 400 people perishing. Several sources quote 383 victims but the exact figure is unknown as the number of those aboard was not confirmed.

Aftermath
Early accounts attributed the accident to Heimara hitting a loose mine, however they were not confirmed. Investigations concluded that she had drifted several miles off course. Due to its high death toll, the accident become known as the Greek Titanic.

See also

References

Maritime incidents in Greece
Maritime incidents in 1947
Shipwrecks in the Aegean Sea
1905 ships
1947 in Greece